Mark Hammerton Group Ltd was a UK-based travel organiser and travel publisher specialising in camping, caravanning, motorhome and mobile home holidays on campsites in France, Spain, Italy and other European countries. The Group published the market-leading Alan Rogers campsites guides and offered a European travel service for readers including ferry bookings. The Group was acquired by The Caravan Club in 2012 under the brand Alan Rogers Travel Group, along with its subsidiary company Belle France, which offers walking and cycling hotel holidays.

Company history
Mark Hammerton Travel Ltd was launched in 1999. The directors, including Mark Hammerton himself, had years of experience working for established camping holiday operators and the first tour operating programme featured pre-sited tents and mobile homes in France and a pitch and ferry reservation service for readers of the (then) independent Alan Rogers guides.

A year later, the company became the exclusive UK agent for Camping Cheque, the UK's leading low season holiday product for independent campers and caravanners and in October 2001 the newly named, Mark Hammerton Group, acquired the company behind the Alan Rogers campsite guides. First published in 1968, the guides were already established as the leader in the UK campsite guide market.

In September 2002 the Group formed a Dutch subsidiary and opened a small office near Amersfoort in the Netherlands to promote sales of the Alan Rogers campsite guides in the Dutch language.

A month later followed the acquisition of another tour operator, the cycling and walking holiday specialist Belle France.

In October 2004, following another year of rapid growth in Camping Cheque sales, the Group acquired a minority stake in French campsite organisation, Kawan Group.

2005 saw the launch of Alan Rogers Marketing in the Netherlands with this office becoming focused on only sales of promotional products and marketing services to European campsites.

In 2006, the Group introduced websites aimed at direct ferry sales and direct holiday insurance sales for campers and caravanners. The company also launched the UnityPlus card, a discount scheme for holidaymakers owning a tent, caravan or motorhome.

2007 saw the company's busiest year ever for Camping Cheque sales.

In 2012, the company was acquired by The Caravan Club under the brand name Alan Rogers Travel Group.

Brands

Alan Rogers Guides

Alan Rogers Guides are a popular campsite guide featuring a selection of the best, inspected and selected campsites in Europe. Aimed at the British and Dutch markets of tent, caravan and motorhome owners, there are separate guides for Britain and Ireland, France, Spain and Portugal, Italy and Central Europe and a Europe-wide guide.

Alan Rogers Travel Service

Alan Rogers Travel Service is a holiday booking service for readers of the Alan Rogers Guides. Camping, caravanning and mobile home holidays can be booked on campsites in France, Spain, Italy, The Netherlands and other countries in Europe.

Belle France

Belle France is a hotel-based walking and cycling holiday programme with maps and notes provided to find your way from hotel to hotel (bag transfers are arranged for you). These are soft adventure holidays or activity holidays with the benefit of comfortable hotels and fine cuisine at the end of each busy day.

Insure4Campers

Insure4Campers was a specialist travel insurance product aimed at the camping holiday market. Travel insurance was offered to cover the specific risks associated with tent, caravan or motorhome holidays in France and Europe generally. Single trip and annual travel policies were offered. This product is no longer available.

Ferries4Campers

Ferries4Campers was a dedicated ferry booking website for caravanners and motorhome owners looking for cheap ferry crossings to France. The product is no longer available.

UnityPlus Card

The UnityPlus Card was a discount card offering savings and benefits to campers and caravanners. Aimed at anyone with a tent, caravan or motorhome the discount scheme featured special offers from major camping brands. This product is no longer available.

Joint Venture

Create Digital Media Ltd

Create Digital Media Ltd was founded in early 2011 as a joint venture between Mark Hammerton Group and the company's founders. The mobile app development company specialised in creating iPhone and Android apps and in electronic publishing activities for Mark Hammerton Group and 3rd party companies and organisations. 

As part of the acquisition by The Caravan Club in 2012, it was announced in October 2014 that Create DM would be winding down its operations. The company was shut down shortly after and app development was passed over to 3rd party companies.

References
 Daily Telegraph, June 8, 2002 – Tents without the nervous headache Discusses camping and some of the company's brands.

External links
 Alan Rogers Travel
 The Caravan and Motorhome Club

Travel and holiday companies of the United Kingdom
Publishing companies established in 1999
1999 establishments in the United Kingdom